Herman Hoeksema (13 March 1886 in Hoogezand – 2 September 1965 in Grand Rapids) was a Dutch Reformed theologian. Hoeksema served as a long time pastor of the First Protestant Reformed Church in Grand Rapids. In 1924 he refused to accept the three points of common grace as formulated which had then been declared official church dogma of the Christian Reformed Church, as an addition to its adopted creeds and confessions. The result of this controversy was that Hoeksema, and ministers George Ophoff, and Henry Danhof, were deposed by their respective classes before leaving the CRC with their congregations. These men then established the Protestant Reformed Churches. He also was professor of theology at the Protestant Reformed Theological Seminary in Grandville, Michigan for 40 years.

Early life
Hoeksema was born in the province of Groningen in the Netherlands and immigrated to the US in 1904. He married Nellie Kuiper on June 7, 1914. The officiating minister was Prof. Louis Berkhof, who was the principal author of the Three points of Common Grace, and later the doctrinal opponent of Hoeksema. The marriage of Herman and Nellie produced 5 children: Joanna, Jeanette, Herman Jr., Homer, and Lois.

After studying at Calvin Theological Seminary in Grand Rapids, Michigan, he began his ministerial career in 14th St. Christian Reformed Church in Holland, Michigan (1915-1920) and then accepted the call to serve the Eastern Avenue Christian Reformed Church of Grand Rapids (1920-1924/5) - by this time one of the largest Reformed congregations in the United States.

In February 1918, Hoeksema refused to allow the American flag in the sanctuary of 14th St Christian Reformed Church (Holland, MI) during worship. This decision received strong opposition. In response the Michigan Tradesman printed that any preacher who barred the flag from his church had "forfeited the right to exist among decent people". He also led the debate, and the 1918 CRC Synod, in condemning the dispensational premillennialism of Rev. Harry Bultema of Muskegon, Michigan who denied that Christ is King of his church. Hoeksema and his close colleague Henry Danhof also worked on behalf of the Seminary Curatorium in a study committee that led the 1922 CRC Synod to produce a report examining the teachings of Seminary Professor Ralph Janssen about Scripture and miracles, and subsequently decided that Janssen's views on Scriptures denied that Holy Writ was infallible and inspired in all it parts.

At the end of his career he served in the dual role of pastor of First Protestant Reformed Church in Grand Rapids, Michigan (1924/5 - 1965) and Professor of New Testament Studies and Reformed Dogmatics at the Protestant Reformed Theological Seminary.

Works
Hoeksema was editor of the Protestant Reformed Magazine, the "Standard Bearer". He also authored many books including:
 Whosoever Will, a negative critique of Arminian Protestantism
 Righteous by Faith Alone, Herman Hoeksema's sermons on the book of Romans
 Behold He cometh, a commentary on the Book of Revelation
 The Triple Knowledge, the most extensive work in the English language on the Heidelberg Catechism
 Reformed Dogmatics, Herman Hoeksema considered this his major work and it is a frequently quoted writing in opposition to the "covenant of works."

Theology
Herman Hoeksema was unique in his emphasis of the Covenant of Grace in that God's love for his chosen was an unconditional love of a friendship where the believers walked with God like Enoch, Noah, and Abraham, and were "friend[s] of God".  He believed that this covenant of friendship is not a unilateral or bilateral agreement and it does not contain conditions, requirements, or demands.

Hoeksema's Reformed Dogmatics states The Covenant of Grace "is the relation of the most intimate communion of friendship in which God reflects His own covenant life in His relation to the creature, gives to that creature life, and causes him to taste and acknowledge the highest good and the overflowing fountain of all good."

"To determine the idea of the covenant, it is better to note those passages of Scripture that speak of the relation between God and His covenant people.  And then there can no doubt that the emphasis is not on the idea of an agreement, or pact, but rather that of a living relationship between God those whom He has chosen in Jesus Christ our Lord."

Herman Hoeksema agreed with Luther in his Bondage of the Will that "merit" is an impious word when used concerning man's relation to God (including Adam's relationship to God), but not with Christ's relationship with God as taught concerning man in Luke 17:10, Jesus says, "So likewise ye, when ye shall have done all those things which are commanded you, say, We are unprofitable servants: we have done that which was our duty to do."

"… First of all, there is the chief objection that this doctrine (The Covenant of Works) finds no support in Scripture.  We do read of the probationary command, prohibiting man to eat of the fruit of the tree of knowledge of good and evil, and of the penalty of death threatened in the case of disobedience.  But nowhere do we find any proof in Scripture for the contention that God gave to Adam the promise of eternal life if he should obey that particular commandment of God.  It is true, of course, that Adam would not have suffered the death penalty if he had obeyed.  But this is quite different from saying that he would have attained to glory and immortality. This cannot be deduced or inferred from the penalty of death that was threatened.  Adam might have lived everlastingly in his earthly state.  He might have continued to eat of the tree of life and live forever; but everlasting earthly life is not the same as what Scripture means by eternal life.  And that Adam would have attained to this higher level of heavenly glory, that there would have come a time in his life when he would have been translated, the Scriptures nowhere suggest.  Besides, this giving of the probationary command and this threat of the penalty of death are no covenant or agreement, constitute no transaction between God and Adam….  In vain does one look in the Word of God for support of this theory of a covenant of works."

"... it is quite impossible that man should merit a special reward with God.  Obedience to God is an obligation.  It certainly has its reward, for God is just and rewards the good with good.  But obedience has its reward in itself: to obey the Lord our God is life and joy.  Sin is misery and death.  Life and joy there are in obedience.  To keep the commandments of God and to serve Him is a privilege.  But the covenant of works teaches that Adam could merit something more, something special, by obeying the command of the Lord.

Bibliography
 Hoeksema, Gertrude, Therefore Have I Spoken: A Biography of Herman Hoeksema, (1969) 
 Baskwell, P.J., Herman Hoeksema: A Theological Biography, Amsterdam: Vrije Universiteit, (2006),  — available online in PDF

See also
 Covenant theology
 Herman Bavinck
 Gerrit Cornelis Berkouwer
 Klaas Schilder

References

External links
Protestant Reformed Churches Home Page
History of the Protestant Reformed Churches
Reformed Free Publishing Association — the publisher of Hoeksema's books 
Herman Hoeksema: Theologian and Reformer  — a biographical article by Prof. Herman Hanko
Studies in Bible Doctrine — a project of Rev. Bernard Woudenberg, a student and contemporary of Herman Hoeksema.The site includes an account of the debate with Klaas Schilder regarding the Covenant of Grace.
Audio Sermons of Rev. Herman Hoeksema 
Dr. Herman Hoeksema, Reformed.net

1886 births
1965 deaths
People from Hoogezand-Sappemeer
Dutch Calvinist and Reformed theologians
Dutch emigrants to the United States
Protestant Reformed Churches in America ministers
Supralapsarians
American Calvinist and Reformed theologians
20th-century Calvinist and Reformed theologians
Calvin Theological Seminary alumni